Sanchita Banerjee is an Indian actress. Banerjee was born on 23 March in the Kolkata, West Bengal India. Banerjee mainly works in Bhojpuri films and television serials. She made her on-screen debut with Raktdhar (2017) and her Bhojpuri debut was Nirahua Hindustani 2.

Career
After the release of Sanchita Banerjee's popularity, Bhojpuri film Raksha Bandhan rasal apane Bhai ki dhaal started touching the highs and added a big boost to her career.

Filmography

References

Living people
Indian film actresses
21st-century Indian actresses
1994 births